The 81st Flying Training Wing is an inactive United States Air Force unit.  It was last assigned to the Western Flying Training Command, and was disbanded on 1 November 1945 at the Santa Ana Army Air Base, California.

The squadron was a World War II Command and Control unit, its mission was to provide classification and preflight testing of aviation cadets.  It was one of three such centers, the others being at Maxwell Field, Alabama and San Antonio Aviation Cadet Center, Texas.

There is no lineage between the current United States Air Force 81st Training Wing, established on 15 April 1948 at Wheeler Field, Hawaii, and this organization.

History
The mission of the wing was to provide both Classification and Preflight stage training to air cadets which had completed Training Command basic indoctrination training.
 Classification Stage processed the cadet and issued him his equipment. This was the stage where it would be decided whether the cadet would train as a navigator, bombardier, or pilot.
 Pre-Flight Stage taught the mechanics and physics of flight and required the cadets to pass courses in mathematics and the hard sciences. Then the cadets were taught to apply their knowledge practically by teaching them aeronautics, deflection shooting, and thinking in three dimensions. The 81st FTW was the only wing which provided preflight training of pilots, navigators and bombardiers

Once the cadet successfully completed the training at the center, they would be assigned to one of the AAF primary flight schools for initial flying training.

Lineage
 Established as 81st Flying Training Wing on 14 October 1943
 Activated on 25 August 1943
 Disbanded on 1 November 1945

Assignments
 Army Air Forces Western Flying Training Command, 25 August 1943 – 30 June 1945

Units
 Army Air Forces Classification Center, 30 April 1942 – 1 May 1944
 Army Air Forces Preflight School (Pilot), 30 April 1942 – 1 May 1944
 1040th Army Air Forces Base Unit, 1 May 1944 – 1 November 1945

Stations
 Santa Ana Army Air Base, California, 25 August 1943 – 30 June 1945

See also

 Army Air Forces Training Command
 Other Training Command Preflight/classification Units:
 74th Flying Training Wing (World War II)  Eastern Flying Training Command
 78th Flying Training Wing (World War II)  Central Flying Training Command
 Other Western Flying Training Command Flight Training Wings:
 35th Flying Training Wing (World War II)  Basic/Advanced Flight Training (California)
 36th Flying Training Wing (World War II) Primary Flight Training
 37th Flying Training Wing (World War II)  Basic/Advanced Flight Training (Arizona)
 38th Flying Training Wing (World War II) Bombardier and Specialized 2/4-Engine Training

References

Training wings of the United States Army Air Forces
Military units and formations established in 1943
Military units and formations disestablished in 1945